Maharaja Bahadur Singh, MC (17 March 1920 – 24 December 1977) was the 28th and the last official ruler of the princely state of Bundi belonging to Hada Chauhan clan of Rajputs.

He was born on 17 March 1920 and was the elder son of Dhanurdhar Singh, who was adopted in 1933, by Sir Ishwari Singh of Bundi, the erstwhile ruler of Bundi.

He was educated at Mayo College at Ajmer. He married in April 1938 to Gulab Kunverba, the daughter of Sajjan Singh, the Maharaja of Ratlam and had children.

As a Rajkumar, with the title of Maharaj Kumar Bahadur Singh, he was commissioned into the Indian Army on 26 November 1942 and served with Probyn's Horse during the Second World War, seeing action in Burma and was awarded the Military Cross.

He ascended to the throne of Bundi upon the death of his father Sir Ishwari Singh on 23 April 1945. He was sent back to Bundi from Burma immediately the news was received by his regiment.

He acceded his state of Bundi to the Dominion of India on 7 April 1949.

He held the title of Maharaja of Bundi, until the entitlements and official recognition were abolished by the Government of India through the 26th amendment to the Constitution of India in 1971. 

He remained the titular ruler of Bundi until his death.

He died on 24 December 1977 survived by one son, Ranjit Singh of Bundi and one daughter, Mahendra Kumari.

References

1920 births
1977 deaths
Maharajas of Bundi
Hindu monarchs
Indian royalty
Mayo College alumni
Indian recipients of the Military Cross
Indian Army personnel of World War II
British Indian Army officers